1st Tactical Squadron (known as 1.ELT - 1 Eskadra Lotnictwa Taktycznego in Poland) is a fighter squadron of Polish Air Force established in 2001 in Mińsk Mazowiecki, Poland. Squadron is stationed in 23rd Air Base and operates  MiG-29 9.12A and MiG-29UB 9.51A jet fighters. Unit has been created on the base of 1st Fighter Regiment (1944–2001).

Equipment

References

Squadrons of the Polish Air Force